The Mari Autonomous Oblast was created on November 4, 1920, as a region of the Russian Soviet Federative Socialist Republic.  In 1936 it was re-established as the Mari Autonomous Soviet Socialist Republic, which dissolved in 1990, then developing into the modern Mari El Republic within Russian Federation.

The Oblast was largely populated by the Mari people.  Events in its early history include the Russian famine of 1921–22 and the 1921 Mari wildfires.

History
The Mari Autonomous Okrug was formed on November 4, 1920 as an autonomous territorial entity for the mountain and meadow Mari . Initially it was divided into 3 cantons , later their number increased to 9.

On July 15, 1929, the Mari Autonomous Region became part of the newly formed Nizhny Novgorod (since 1932 - Gorky) Territory.

As of October 1, 1931, there were 9 districts in the region:

Gorno-Mari national region
Zvenigovsky district
city of Yoshkar-Ola
Mari-Turek district
Morkinsky district
Novo-Toryalsky district
Orsha district
Sernur district
Yurinsky National District
In 9 districts there were 247 village councils, 2 cities (Yoshkar-Ola - 7600 inhabitants, 01/01/1931, Kozmodemyansk  - 8315 inhabitants), 2 workers' settlements (working village Yurino  - 4586 inhabitants, working village Zvenigovo  - 2482 inhabitants), 2795 rural settlements ... The urban population is 24 700 people. (4.8%).

In 1931-1932, a regional division was introduced.

On December 5, 1936, the Gorky Territory was abolished. According to the Constitution of 1936, the Mari Autonomous Region was transformed into the Mari ASSR , which is directly part of the RSFSR .

See also
First Secretary of the Mari Communist Party

References

Autonomous oblasts of the Soviet Union
States and territories established in 1920
1920 establishments in Russia
1936 disestablishments in the Soviet Union